Piers Edgecumbe ( 1609 – 6 January 1667) was an English politician who sat in the House of Commons between 1640 and 1644 and between 1662 and 1667. He supported the Royalist side in the English Civil War.

Edgecumbe was the son of Sir Richard Edgecumbe and his wife Mary Cottle, daughter of Sir Thomas Cottle of London.

In 1628 Edgecumbe was elected Member of Parliament for Newport until 1629 when King Charles I decided to rule without parliament. In April 1640, Edgecumbe was elected MP for Camelford in the Short Parliament and was returned again for the Long Parliament until he was disabled in January 1644. After the Restoration, Edgecumbe was appointed High Sheriff of Cornwall in 1660 and re-elected MP for Newport in 1662, holding the seat until his death in 1667. 

Edgecumbe died at the age of 51 and the inscription on his monument stated he "was a master of languages and sciences; a lover of the King and Church which he endeavoured to support, in the time of the Civil Wars, to the utmost of his power and fortune." 

Edgecumbe married Mary Glanville, second daughter of Sir John Glanville of Broad Hinton in 1636, at St. Dunstan's Church, London. Their son was Sir Richard Edgcumbe, MP.

References

1609 births
1667 deaths
Members of the pre-1707 English Parliament for constituencies in Cornwall
High Sheriffs of Cornwall
English MPs 1628–1629
English MPs 1640 (April)
English MPs 1640–1648
English MPs 1661–1679